Blood Debts is a 1985 Philippine action film directed by Teddy Page and starring Richard Harrison, Mike Monty, James Gaines, and Daniel Andrew.

Plot
While enjoying a picnic, Sarah Collins (Catherine Miles) and her boyfriend are surprised by a gang of juvenile hunters. They rape her and kill him, but just before they are about to kill her she escapes and runs to her parents' house. The gang members shoot Sarah in front of her father, a wealthy Vietnam vet (Richard Harrison) named Mark. The boys wound him seriously and leave.

A few months later, after his health has returned, Mark manages to find the murderers and kills each of them. He also keeps on walking the streets at night, looking for criminals in action to execute until his wife Yvette (Ann Jackson) convinces him to stop. However, he has been observed by the henchmen of Bill (Mike Monty), an enigmatic businessman desiring to crush the local drug syndicate. Bill gives orders to kidnap Yvette and forces Mark to continue his vigilante work.

Mark eventually escapes and stages a one-man assault on Bill's compound, pilfering progressively larger weapons from the henchmen he kills. However, Bill emerges with a pistol and shoots Mark in the back. As Bill prepares to shoot him, Mark pulls out a tiny rocket launcher concealed in his sleeve and fires off a last-ditch shot, blowing up Bill. The film ends with a freeze frame of the explosion and text informing the audience that "mark collins, age 45, gave himself up to the authorities after the incident. he is now serving a life sentence."

Cast 
 Richard Harrison as Mark Collins
 Ann Jackson as Yvette Collins (credited as "Mark's Wife")
 Catherine Miles as Sarah Collins
 Mike Monty as Bill
 James Gaines as Peter

Internet popularity 
The film ends very abruptly, with the credits rolling before the rocket explosion finishes or Bill's body parts hit the ground. Simultaneously, upbeat stock music is played over the scene and the credits, contrasting the dour tone of the on-screen text describing Mark's turning himself in and life sentence. This ending has been uploaded several times on YouTube, usually with sarcastic titles to the effect of "The Proper Way to End Your Film"; the most popular upload on YouTube has over 7 million views.

References

External links

Blood Debts at Rotten Tomatoes

1983 films
1983 action films
Philippine vigilante films
Rape and revenge films
Film and television memes
1980s English-language films